This is a list of animated television series first aired in 2017.

See also
 2017 in animation
 2017 in anime
 List of animated feature films of 2017

References

2017
Television series
2017
2017-related lists